Nehuén Mario Paz (born 28 April 1993) is an Argentine professional footballer who plays for Estudiantes LP, on loan from Universidad Católica as a centre-back.

Career
Paz's career began in 2013 with All Boys in the Argentine Primera División. He made his professional debut at the Estadio Monumental Antonio Vespucio Liberti during a defeat to River Plate on 22 September, which was the first of nineteen appearances throughout the 2013–14 season which ended with relegation. In Primera B Nacional, Paz featured sixteen times and was subsequently signed at the end of the 2014 campaign by Primera División team Newell's Old Boys. He scored his first career goal in his second start for the club, netting the opening goal in a 2–0 win against Godoy Cruz on 21 April 2015.

He remained with Newell's Old Boys for four seasons, scoring twice in fifty-seven appearances in all competitions between 2015 and 2018. On 30 January 2018, Paz joined Italian Serie A side Bologna. On 4 February, Paz was loaned back to Argentina to play for Lanús. His first appearance arrived in a 2–1 Copa Sudamericana defeat to Sporting Cristal on 7 March, which preceded a further three matches for them. He returned to Bologna for the next season and a half, as he made his club debut during a two-goal loss away to Juventus on 26 September 2018.

On 31 January 2020, after six appearances for his parent club, Paz joined fellow Serie A team Lecce on loan; purchase option included. After debuting in 4–0 victory over Torino on 2 February, the defender appeared twelve further times as they suffered relegation to Serie B. Paz then went back to Bologna, subsequently featuring for the club across the first half of 2020–21; notably scoring his first goal in the process, as he netted in a home draw with Atalanta on 23 December. On 1 February 2021, Turkish Süper Lig side Kayserispor announced the loan acquisition of Paz; until the succeeding June.

On 27 August 2021, Paz signed a two-year contract with Serie B club Crotone. On 19 February 2022, the contract was terminated by mutual consent.

On 23 February 2022, Paz signed a four-year contract with Universidad Católica in Chile. On second half 2022, he was loaned to Estudiantes de La Plata until the end of the season.

Career statistics
.

References

External links
 
 
 

1993 births
Living people
Footballers from Buenos Aires
Argentine footballers
Association football defenders
Argentine expatriate footballers
Expatriate footballers in Italy
Expatriate footballers in Turkey
Expatriate footballers in Chile
Argentine expatriate sportspeople in Italy
Argentine expatriate sportspeople in Turkey
Argentine expatriate sportspeople in Chile
Argentine Primera División players
Primera Nacional players
Serie A players
Süper Lig players
Serie B players
Chilean Primera División players
All Boys footballers
Newell's Old Boys footballers
Bologna F.C. 1909 players
Club Atlético Lanús footballers
U.S. Lecce players
Kayserispor footballers
F.C. Crotone players
Club Deportivo Universidad Católica footballers
Estudiantes de La Plata footballers